Yuri Yevlampiyevich Titov (born 27 November 1935) is a former Russian gymnast, Olympic champion and four times world champion, who competed for the Soviet Union. He won a total of nine Olympic medals from three Olympic games (1956, 1960 and 1964).

Olympics

Titov competed at the 1956 Summer Olympics in Melbourne where he won a gold medal in team combined exercises with the Soviet team (with Viktor Chukarin, Valentin Muratov, Boris Shakhlin, Albert Azaryan and Pavel Stolbov). He also won an individual silver medal in horizontal bar, and bronze medals in all-around and vault. He won silver and bronze medals at the 1960 Summer Olympics in Rome, and two silver medals at the 1964 Summer Olympics in Tokyo.

World championships
Titov won gold medals in vault and team at the 1958 World Artistic Gymnastics Championships in Moscow, and bronze medals in all-around, floor exercise, rings and horizontal bar.

He won gold medals in all-around and rings at the 1962 World Artistic Gymnastics Championships in Prague, as well as a team silver medal.

European championships
Titov won 14 medals at the European Gymnastics Championships.

Later career
Titov was president of the International Gymnastics Federation (FIG) for 20 years, from 1977 to 1996. As the FIG President, he was also a member of International Olympic Committee in 1995–1996. He was president of the Russian Artistics Gymnastics Federation from 2004 until 2006 and then first vice president.

Writing
He has written and published four books, among others, one about rhythmic gymnastics (with Nadejda Jastriembskaja).

Awards
Titov received the Olympic Order from the International Olympic Committee in 1992. He was inducted into the International Gymnastics Hall of Fame in 1999.

He received the Order of the Red Banner of Labour in 1960, and again in 1980. He received the Order of Friendship of Peoples in 1976, and the Order of the Badge of Honor in 1957.

See also
List of multiple Olympic medalists

References

External links
 

1935 births
Living people
Russian male artistic gymnasts
Soviet male artistic gymnasts
Olympic gymnasts of the Soviet Union
Gymnasts at the 1956 Summer Olympics
Gymnasts at the 1960 Summer Olympics
Gymnasts at the 1964 Summer Olympics
Olympic gold medalists for the Soviet Union
Olympic silver medalists for the Soviet Union
Olympic bronze medalists for the Soviet Union
Olympic medalists in gymnastics
International Olympic Committee members
Sportspeople from Omsk
Medalists at the 1964 Summer Olympics
Medalists at the 1960 Summer Olympics
Medalists at the 1956 Summer Olympics
Medalists at the World Artistic Gymnastics Championships
Universiade medalists in gymnastics
Presidents of the Fédération Internationale de Gymnastique
Universiade silver medalists for the Soviet Union
Medalists at the 1961 Summer Universiade
European champions in gymnastics